This article is about the coat of arms of the German state of Saarland.

Description
The coat of arms of Saarland is parted per cross:
The first quarter shows the coat of arms of the prince of Nassau-Saarbrücken, a silver lion with golden crown, between nine crosslets argent. The shield is blue. It represents the town district of Saarbrücken and the district of Neunkirchen.
The second quarter shows the coat of arms of the prince elector, archbishop of Trier, in Trier. The charge is a red three-dimensional symmetric cross. The arms are advance to the axis. It represents the districts of Merzig-Wadern and St Wendel.
The third quarter shows the coat of arms of the duchy of Lorraine and represents the district of Saarlouis. It shows three silver alerions on a red bend, on a yellow field.
The fourth quarter, the coat of arms of the prince elector Palatinate, represents the Saarpfalz district, which once was part of the Palatinate. The black shield is charged with a yellow lion rampant, whose claws and tongue are painted in red.
  
The actual legal base of the use of the coat of arms is:

History

References

See also
Flag of Saarland
Coat of arms of Prussia
Coat of arms of Germany
Origin of the coats of arms of German federal states.

Saarland
Saarland
Culture of Saarland
Saarland
Saarland
Saarland